This is an incomplete list of the publications of the London Record Society.

Main series by volume number
Chew, H. M. ed., London possessory assizes: a calendar, (1965)
Glass, D. V. ed., London inhabitants within the walls, 1695, (1966)
Darlington, I. ed., London Consistory Court Wills, 1492–1547, (1967)
Steer, F. W., Scriveners' Company Common paper, 1357–1628, with a continuation to 1678, (1968)
Rowe, D. J. ed., London radicalism, 1830–43: a selection from the papers of Francis Place, (1970)
Chew, H. M.; Weinbaym, M. eds., The London Eyre of 1244, (1970)
Hodgett, G. A. J. ed., The Cartulary of Holy Trinity, Aldgate, (1971)
Dietz, B. ed., The port and trade of Elizabethan London: documents, (1972)
Croft, P. ed., The Spanish Company, (1973)
Chew, H. M.; Kellaway, W. eds., London Assize of Nuisance, 1301–1431: a Calendar, (1973)
Welch, C. E. ed., Two Calvinistic Methodist Chapels, 1743–1811: the London Tabernacle and Spa Fields Chapel, (1975)
Weinbaum, M. ed., The London Eyre of 1276, (1976)
McHardy, A. K., The Church in London, 1375–1392, (1977)
Davis, T. W. ed., Committees for repeal of the Test and Corporation Acts: minutes, 1786–90 and 1827–8, (1978)
Price, J. M. ed., Joshua Johnson’s Letterbook, 1771–1774: letters from a merchant in London to his partners in Maryland, (1979)
Kitching, C. J. ed., London and Middlesex Chantry Certificates, 1548, (1980)
Creaton, H. J. ed., London Politics 1713–1717, (1981)
Basing, P. ed., Parish Fraternity Register: Fraternity of the Holy Trinity and SS. Fabian and Sebastian in the parish of St. Botolph without Aldersgate, (1982)
Harris, G. G. ed., Trinity House of Deptford transactions, 1609–35, (1983)
Masters, B. R. ed., Chamber accounts of the 16th century, (1984)
Steckley, G. F. ed., The letters of John Paige, London merchant, 1648–58, (1984)
Keene, D.; Harding, V., A Survey of documentary sources for property holding in London before the Great Fire, (1985)
Port, M. H., ed., The commissions for building fifty new churches: the minute books, 1711–27, a calendar, (1986)
Richard Hutton's Complaints Book: The Notebook of the Steward of the Quaker Workhouse at Clerkenwell, 1711–1737
Westminster Abbey Charters, 1066-c.1214
London Viewers and their Certificates, 1508–1558: Certificates of the Sworn Viewers of the City of London
The Overseas Trade of London: Exchequer Customs Accounts, 1480–1
Justice In Eighteenth-Century Hackney: The Justicing Notebook of Henry Norris and the Hackney Petty Sessions Book
Two Tudor Subsidy Assessment Rolls for the City of London: 1541 and 1582
London Debating Societies, 1776–1799
London Bridge: Selected Accounts and Rentals, 1381–1538
London Consistory Court Depositions, 1586–1611: List and Indexes
Chelsea Settlement and Bastardy Examinations 1733–1766
The Church Records of St Andrew Hubbard Eastcheap, c. 1450-c. 1570
London and Middlesex Exchequer Equity Pleadings, 1685–6 And 1784–5: A Calendar
The Letters of William Freeman, London Merchant, 1678–1685
Unpublished London Diaries: A Checklist of unpublished diaries by Londoners and visitors with a select Bibliography of published diaries
The English Fur Trade In The Later Middle Ages
The Bede Roll of the Fraternity of St Nicholas Eds. N. W. & V. A. James, 2004. 
The Estate and Household Accounts of William Worsley, Dean of St Paul's Cathedral, 1479–1497
A Woman in Wartime London: The Diary of Kathleen Tipper 1941–1945. Ed. Patricia and Robert Malcolmson, 2006. 
Prisoners' Letters to the Bank of England 1783–1827. Ed. Deirdre Palk, 2007. 
The Apprenticeship Of A Mountaineer: Edward Whymper's London Diary 1855–1859
The Pinners' and Wiresellers' Book 1462–1511
London Inhabitants Outside the Walls
The Views of Hosts of Alien Merchants 1440–1444
The Great Wardrobe Accounts of Henry VII and Henry VIII
Summary Justice in the City
The Diaries of John Wilkes, 1770–1797
A Free-Spirited Woman. The London Diaries of Gladys Langford, 1936–1940

Occasional publications
Sims, J.M. (1970) London and Middlesex published records: A handlist. Occasional Publications, Vol. 1.

Extra series
McEwan, J.A. (2016) Seals in Medieval London 1050-1300. A Catalogue. Extra Series, Vol. 1.

Sources
http://londonrecordsociety.org.uk/publications/
https://boydellandbrewer.com/imprints-affiliates/london-record-society.html
http://royalhistsoc.org/wp-content/uploads/2014/09/londonrecordsociety.pdf

History of London
Series of non-fiction books
London-related lists